Bryce's Base Ball Guides were two annual Canadian baseball publications, in 1876 and 1877, which provided information to baseball fans and players.

A treasure-trove of information about early Canadian baseball as well as the International Association, they came to light in 2002 when Library and Archives Canada purchased (for $10,000 from an Ottawa bookseller) Bryce's Base Ball Guide of 1876 and Bryce's Base Ball Guide of 1877, two hand-coloured, 75-page booklets published by William Bryce of London, Ontario.  They originally sold for a dime. 

The two, four-inch by seven-inch guides are considered to be the first significant publications on Canadian (and American) baseball. Bryce, a Scottish-born bookseller, news agent and sporting goods distributor in London, had a small stake in the London Tecumsehs, considered by many to be the finest ball team in Canada.

During President George W. Bush's visit to the Library and Archives Canada building on November 30, 2004, he showed a special interest in these two early Canadian baseball books which were laid out for his perusal.

External links
 Evolution of a National Pastime, Canadians at Bat for their Place in History by William Humber
 1876 and 1877 Bryce Baseball Guides

Sports reference works
Baseball books